Ramshayeh (also Romanized as Ramshāyeh) is a village in Shabkhus Lat Rural District, Rankuh District, Amlash County, Gilan Province, Iran. At the 2006 census, its population was 216, in 60 families.

References 

Populated places in Amlash County